The Confederate States of Lanao (Pat a Pangampong sa Ranao), also known as the Lanao Sultanate, collective term for four states named Bayabao, Masiu, Unayan, and Balo in Mindanao, Philippines.

Before the Maranaos were invaded by the Maguindanao Sultanate it already existed as a separate nation. The Chinese chronicle Zhufan zhi 諸蕃志 published on 1225, described it as a country southeast of Shahuagong (Sanmalan) in present day Zamboanga, a country called "Maluonu" of which, this is what the chronicles have to say.

Eventually the Lanao nation fell under the power of the Maguindanao Sultanate.

Afterwards though, the chieftains of the Bayabao, Masiu, Unayan, and Baloi states seceded from the Maguindanao Sultanate in 1616. The Lanao Sultanate consists of traditional leaders and forty-three sultans. Fifteen of these sultans heads the fifteen royal houses of Lanao

As of 2004, the sultanates of Lanao govern themselves within the Republic of the Philippines as the Sultanate League of Lanao. In February 9, 2007, President Gloria Macapagal Arroyo issued Executive Order No. 602 which founded the Lanao Advisory Council to facilitate the Philippine national government's relations with 16 royal houses in the Lanao area.

References

Former sultanates
Former countries in Philippine history
History of Mindanao
History of Lanao del Sur
History of the Philippines (1565–1898)
History of the Philippines (900–1565)
States and territories established in 1616